Simlagarh railway station is a Kolkata Suburban Railway station on the Howrah–Bardhaman main line operated by Eastern Railway zone of Indian Railways. It is situated beside Talbona Colony Road, National Highway 2 at Simlagarh in Hooghly district in the Indian state of West Bengal. The distance between Howrah and Simlagarh railway station is approximately 65 km.

History
On 1 February 1855 the first train ran from Howrah to  through Howrah–Bardhaman main line. Bandel to Bardhaman rout was opened for traffic on 1 January 1885. Electrification of the Howrah–Bardhaman main line was initiated up to Bandel in 1957, with the 3000 v DC system, and the entire Howrah–Bardhaman route including Simlagarh railway station completed with AC system, along with conversion of earlier DC portions to 25 kV AC, in 1958.

References

Railway stations in Hooghly district
Kolkata Suburban Railway stations
Howrah railway division